Jory may refer to:

Persons
Jory (surname)
Jory Nash, folk music-oriented Canadian singer-songwriter and musician
Jory Prum (born 1975), American audio engineer
Jory Vinikour (born 1963), American harpsichordist
Jory (singer) or Jory Boy, a Puerto Rican reggaeton singer

Others
Jory (soil), a type of soil
Jory (film), a 1973 Western starring Robby Benson

See also
Jouri, an Arabic female name